North Karanpura Thermal Power Station is an upcoming coal-based thermal power plant located in Tandwa in the Simaria subdivision of the Chatra district, Jharkhand. The power plant is owned by NTPC Limited.

Geography

Location

Note: The map alongside presents some of the notable locations in the district. All places marked in the map are linked in the larger full screen map.

Capacity
The planned capacity of the power plant is 1980 MW (3x660 MW).

The project was originally proposed in 1999 but got delayed because Coal India Limited objected to the location of the power plant and wanted NTPC to relocate the power plant as it was coming up on site having 6 billion tonnes of coal underneath it. Coal India Limited withdrew the coal linkage to the plant in 2008. The Government of India finally decided in 2013 February against the relocation and in 2013 July, the coal linkage for the plant was restored. The foundation stone was finally laid in August 2014.

Progress
Efforts are on to get the first unit of the North Karanpura Thermal Power Station ready in 2021. The other two units are expected to be in operation by 2023.

References

Coal-fired power stations in Jharkhand
Chatra district
Proposed power stations in India